A regional airliner or a feederliner is a small airliner that is designed to fly up to 100 passengers on short-haul flights, usually feeding larger carriers' airline hubs from small markets. This class of airliners is typically flown by the regional airlines that are either contracted by or subsidiaries of the larger airlines. Regional airliners are used for short trips between smaller towns or from a larger city to a smaller city. Feederliner, commuter, and local service are all alternative terms for the same class of flight operations.

History

To keep short routes economical, airlines preferred using second hand aircraft than costlier new aircraft. Older aircraft were put into short haul service as they were replaced by new longer-range designs.

Post-war era

Propeller aircraft of larger airlines were transferred to smaller airlines: even the De Havilland Dragon Rapide biplane, or the Douglas DC-3s, in large surplus after the war, which the Aircraft manufacturers wanted to replace. The first piston powered airliners with 40 seats were the Martin 2-0-2s (introduced in 1947) and Convair CV-240s (1948).

Turboprop designs

The first turboprop powered aircraft emerged like the Vickers Viscount (75 seats, introduced in 1953) and Fokker F27 (48–56 seats, 1958). Some smaller turboprop airliners were developed in the 1960s like the British Shorts Skyvan (19 seats, 1963), and French Nord 262 (29 seats, 1964) or Brazilian Embraer EMB 110 Bandeirante (1973). This "hand-me-down" process of supplying aircraft continued with designs like the Convair 440 and Douglas DC-6 also serving in this role while the first jets were introduced.

By the mid-1950s, demand for even more economical designs led to the production of the first custom feederliners. These were almost always turboprops, which had fuel economy on par with piston engine designs, but had far lower maintenance costs. Often the time between engine overhaul periods was five times that of the best piston engines. Early examples of these designs include the Fokker F27 Friendship, Avro 748, and Handley Page Dart Herald.

These designs were so successful that it was to be many years before newer designs bettered them enough to make it worthwhile in terms of capital investment to develop. Among the first purpose built airliners developed for the CAB sanctioned local-service airlines in the US, the predecessors of the modern regional airliner industry; was the interim and custom built Fairchild F-27/FH-227's  for the needs of these smaller but expanding airlines of the late 1960s.

There were a few other exceptions, generally tailored to more specific roles. For instance, the Handley Page Jetstream (first flight in 1968) was intended for fewer passengers at much higher speeds, displacing smaller designs like the Beechcraft Queen Air. The Fairchild/Swearingen Metro (developed from the original Queen Air through a number of stages) filled a similar niche.

By the 1970s the first generation regional airliners were starting to wear out, but there had been little effort in producing new designs for this market.  A varied list of light transport aircraft supplanted by newer and more modern 30 seat designs by Shorts with their Shorts 330 and 360 as well as other aircraft manufacturers, replaced and sometimes provided growth to established commuter markets. Additional development came to the regional airline industry with the arrival of some of the earlier  De Havilland Canada types such as the Dash 7 delivered in 1978, but this was tailored more to the short-range and STOL (Short Take-Off and Landing) role than as a regional airliner. Feedback from the airlines was fairly consistent, and De Havilland responded with the Dash 8 in 1984, which had economic benefits over the earlier generation machines, and was faster and quieter as well.

In the early 1980s, the Dash 8's success sparked off development of a number of similar designs, including the ATR 42/72, Saab 340, Embraer Brasilia and Fokker 50. Consequently, there were a relatively large number of aircraft offered by manufacturers in this sector of the market, pushing older 1950s designs from Fokker, Vickers and others into retirement. Due to the high level of competition, production of a number of these types ceased. Saab AB exited the civil aviation market and wrote its debts off, Daimler-Benz Aerospace "pulled the plug" on Dornier, and British Aerospace ended production of their BAe Jetstream 41 after 100 delivered. By 2006 only the ATR 42/72 models and the Dash 8 remained in production.

Turboprop airliner deliveries are correlated with oil prices with a lag of a few years.

In 2018, 245.4 million two-way seats were offered on turboprop flights, up from 201.4 million in 2009, with 97% of flights below  and 87% below , and an average capacity increasing to 51 seats from 44 seats in 2009.
The largest user was Air Canada with 12.7 million seats, followed by Flybe with 10.3 million and Wings Air with 9.24 million.
Canada was the largest market with 30.5 million seats, then Indonesia with 14.3 and the US with 13.4.
The busiest turboprop airport was Vancouver (2.75 Million seats) followed by Toronto Pearson (2.64) then Seattle-Tacoma (2.39).

Noise

Although turboprops are quiet to outside observers, propwash makes them noisy inside. 
Active noise reduction should reduce the cabin noise of the Bombardier Q400 or the ATR 72-600.

Market forecast 

Flight Global fleet forecasts 3,081 turboprop deliveries for a $63 Bn value and 4,042 regional jet deliveries for a $130 Bn value for the 2016–2035 period. In turboprops, ATR with 12% of the market should dominate the Dash 8 Q400 (3%); while Embraer with 40% should lead the Regional Jets market above the Mitsubishi MRJ (17%) and Superjet 100 (4%), while Bombardier Aerospace moves to the small narrowbody aircraft with the CSeries and doesn't develop the CRJ700 series (2%).

Embraer claims crossover regional jets are more cost-efficient than current turboprops beyond , representing 45% of 70-seat turboprops flights in 2017, leading Widerøe to switch to E-Jets E2 except for destinations with short runways and severe weather conditions north of the Arctic Circle or AirBaltic to replace its 12 Q400s by CSeries.
From 2018 to 2037, ATR forecasts 3,020 turboprop deliveries : 630 with 40–60 seats and 2,390 with 61–80 seats.

Hybrid aircraft 

As legacy regional aircraft are used on very short sectors like connecting islands, their replacements could be hybrid or electric aircraft.
Hybrid-electric aircraft propulsion remains impeded by energy storage, high-power electric distribution and the lack of certification framework.
ATR Aircraft dismiss a fully electric propulsion as carrying the same payload over the same distances as an  ATR 42, current batteries would weigh .

Current projects are small 10-seaters, like the Israeli Eviation Alice or the Boeing-backed Zunum Aero ZA12 powered by a Safran Ardiden turboshaft and targeting 40-80% lower operating costs.
The French VoltAero Cassio based on the Cessna 337 Skymaster like the U.S. Ampaire, U.S. Wright Electric works with Spain’s Axter Aerospace to re-engine a nine-seater and the Cessna Caravan is re-engined with a MagniX electric motor.
United Technologies is re-engining a Dash 8 Q100 on one side with a  gas turbine and a  electric motor instead of the current  Pratt & Whitney Canada PW121, for at least 30% energy savings.

Design

Turboprop regional aircraft
Regional airlines serving small hubs or airports with short runways will often use turboprop aircraft with propeller engines versus jet engines. de Havilland Canada (Dash 7 and Dash 8), Antonov (An-24 and An-140), Xi'an Aircraft Industrial Corporation (MA60, MA600 and MA700) and ATR  (ATR 42 and ATR 72) are manufacturers of this type.

Regional jets

A regional jet (RJ) is a jet airliner with less than 100 seats. The first one was the Sud-Aviation Caravelle in 1959, followed by the widespread Yakovlev Yak-40, Fokker F-28 and BAe 146. The 1990s saw the emergence of the most widespread  Canadair Regional Jet and its Embraer Regional Jet counterpart, then the larger Embraer E-Jet family and multiple competing projects. In the US, they are limited in size by scope clauses.

Accommodation

Seating on regional airliners tends to be narrow and tight, and passengers typically are restricted from bringing on board carry-on items which would fit without difficulty in the overhead bins of larger aircraft. Often carry-on luggage is collected immediately prior to boarding and placed in the cargo hold, where it can be quickly retrieved by the ground staff while the passengers exit. Compared with bigger planes, many frequent fliers find regional jets cabins cramped and uncomfortable, with a lower ceiling, tight seating and single-class cabins forbidding a first-class upgrade.

Operations

Costs

In the US, major carriers contracts with regional airlines on a per flight basis regardless of the number of passengers, and the major carrier keep the ticket revenue. These contracts are typically 10 year terms, the regional aircraft operators are certain of their revenue and have to control their costs to earn a return, but they face airline bankruptcies, fleet reductions and increasing operating costs. Major carriers avoid shouldering losses from regional aircraft operators and competition between regional airlines has grounded many regional aircraft.

In production aircraft

See also
 List of regional airliners
 Regional jet

References

Civil aircraft
Airliners